Edward Windsor may refer to:
 Edward of Windsor or Edward III of England (1312–1377)
 Edward Windsor, 3rd Baron Windsor (1532–1574)
 Edward Windsor (cricketer) (1869–1953), Australian cricketer
 Edward VIII or Edward, Duke of Windsor (1894–1972)
 Prince George, Duke of Kent or George Edward Alexander Edmund Windsor (1902–1942), fourth son and fifth child of King George V of the British Empire
 Prince Edward, Duke of Kent or Edward George Nicholas Paul Patrick Windsor (born 1935), grandson of King George V of the British Empire
 Prince Edward, Duke of Edinburgh or Edward Antony Richard Louis Mountbatten-Windsor (born 1964), third son of Queen Elizabeth II of the British Commonwealth Realms
 Edward Windsor, Lord Downpatrick or Edward Edmund Maximilian George Windsor (born 1988)

See also
 Edward Windsor Richards (1831–1921), British engineer
 House of Windsor